The Four Seasons Resort The Biltmore Santa Barbara is a luxury resort hotel located in Santa Barbara, California known for its Spanish Colonial Revival architecture and gardens.  It opened in 1927 as the Santa Barbara Biltmore, part of the Bowman-Biltmore Hotels chain. Operations were suspended in March 2020 due to the COVID-19 pandemic with no opening date announced.

History
The Santa Barbara Biltmore was designed by architect Reginald Johnson and landscape architect Ralph Stevens in 1926-1927. Their design of the hotel and outdoor garden rooms synthesizes Mediterranean Revival, Spanish Colonial Revival and Moorish Revival styles of architecture. The $1,500,000 construction cost was funded by the Bowman-Biltmore Hotels Corporation of New York City, with a 5 March 1927 groundbreaking.

Allied Properties of San Francisco bought the Biltmore in 1936. They sold the property in 1976 to Marriott for $5.25 million and the hotel was renamed Marriott's Santa Barbara Biltmore. Marriott sold the hotel to Four Seasons Hotels in 1987 for $55 million and it was renamed the Four Seasons Resort Santa Barbara.  In 2000, billionaire Beanie Babies creator Ty Warner purchased the hotel for $150 million, while retaining Four Seasons as the management company.  He restored the hotel at a cost of $240 million and brought back the historic 'Biltmore' name soon after, renaming the hotel the Four Seasons Resort The Biltmore Santa Barbara. Since its 1927 opening, the hotel has been known popularly simply as 'The Biltmore.' Operations were suspended in March 2020 due to the COVID-19 pandemic with no opening date announced.

References

 : Dunn, Jerry Camarillo . "The Biltmore, Santa Barbara: A history".  Pub: Santa Barbara Biltmore Associates. 1990. .

External links
 Four Seasons Resort The Biltmore Santa Barbara website

Hotels in California
Bowman-Biltmore Hotels
Santa Barbara, California
Buildings and structures in Santa Barbara County, California
Tourist attractions in Santa Barbara County, California
Hotels established in 1927
Hotel buildings completed in 1927
1927 establishments in California
Mediterranean Revival architecture in California
Moorish Revival architecture in California
Spanish Colonial Revival architecture in California